The 2005 World Games, the seventh World Games, were an international multi-sport event held in Duisburg, Germany from 14 July 2005 until 24 July 2005. Three other cities, namely Bottrop, Mülheim an der Ruhr, and Oberhausen, also held some of the competition events. More than 3,000 athletes competed in 31 official sports and 6 invitational sports.

Sports

Official sports
The 2005 World Games programme featured 31 official sports, and 6 invitational sports. The numbers in parentheses indicate the number of medal events, which were contested in each sports discipline.

 Casting (6)
 Cue sports (4)

 Field archery (6)

 Powerlifting (6)

Invitational sports
Aikido was also one of the invitational sports, but it was deemed a demonstration sport; no medal events were held.

Medal table

Official sports
The medal tally during the seventh World Games is as follows. Russia won the most gold medals and tied with Germany in overall medals won in this edition's official sports. There was a tie for second place in one sport climbing event (two silver and no bronze medals awarded). Two bronze medals were awarded in each of the two squash events.

Invitational sports

References

External links

Web Site of the 2005 World Games
German web site on the 2005 World Games
Russian web site on the 2005 World Games
Complete Results

 
2005
2005 in multi-sport events
2005 in German sport
International sports competitions hosted by Germany
2005 World Games
Sport in Duisburg
July 2005 sports events in Europe